Henry & Marie Harnischfeger House is a German Renaissance Revival style mansion completed in 1905. The home was built for Wisconsin Industrialist Henry Harnischfeger. In 1991 the City of Milwaukee gave the building a Historical Designation.

History

The building was designed by architect Eugene R. Liebert and completed in 1905. The building is an example of German Renaissance Revival style: the builder was Strachota Builders. The building was locally designated a historic building locally designated: 2-15-1983. The Harnischfeger House was built on Grand Avenue in Milwaukee, Wisconsin. The street is now called Wisconsin Avenue.

Architectural elements
the building is a 2-½ story, gable-roofed mansion which was built on limestone. There are numerous projecting and receding elements.

There are two soldiers holding swords (Atlas (architecture)) on the front of the second floor balcony.
Corbelled Oriel window
A recessed entrance
An arcaded loggia

The building is 8,810sq ft with 13 bedrooms 5.5 bathrooms and 21 total rooms.

References

External links

Historic Designation

Historic sites in Wisconsin
1905 establishments in Wisconsin
Historic American Buildings Survey in Wisconsin
1900s architecture in the United States